USS Aroostook has been the name of three ships of the United States Navy.

 , was a wooden-hulled, steam-propelled, screw gunboat.
 , was a minelayer, which served from 1917 until 1931.
 , was a gasoline tanker which served from 1943 until 1945.

Sources
 

United States Navy ship names